Johann Eduard Erdmann (13 June 1805 – 12 June 1892) was a German religious pastor, historian of philosophy, and philosopher of religion, of which he wrote on the mediation of faith and knowledge. He was known to be a follower of Friedrich Schleiermacher, whom he studied under August Carlblom (1797-1877), and Georg Wilhelm Friedrich Hegel, whom he regarded as his mentor. Erdmann also studied the works of Karl Daub. Historians of philosophy usually include Erdmann as a member of the Right Wing of the Hegelian movement, a group of thinkers who were also referred to variously as the Right Hegelians (Rechtshegelianer), the Hegelian Right (die Hegelsche Rechte), and/or as the Old Hegelians (Althegelianer).

Biography

Erdmann was born on 13 June 1805 in Wolmar, Livonia, where his father was a pastor. Ferdinand Walter (1801-1869), a Lutheran pastor, theologian, and General Superintendent of Livland was Erdmann's maternal uncle. Erdmann and Ferdinand Walter both attended Hegel's lectures on the Phenomenology of Spirit in 1827 in Berlin. Ferdinand Walter's son, Julius Walter (1841-1922), was a professor of philosophy at the Univ. of Königsberg. Erdmann studied theology at Dorpat (Tartu) and afterward at Berlin, where he fell under the influence of Georg Wilhelm Friedrich Hegel, and was known never to miss Hegel's lectures. Then, from 1829 to 1832 he was a minister of religion in his native town of Wolmar. Afterwards he resigned from his position as pastor to devote himself to education and philosophy, but continued to minister throughout his life. He obtained a doctoral degree from the University of Kiel with the treatise, Quidnam sit discrimen philosophiam inter et theologiam (What is the Distinction between Philosophy and Theology?), written in  1830, in which he argued that philosophy and religion converge to a common truth, even though they differ in form of approach. In 1834 he began writing his Habilitation thesis to qualify in Berlin. This became volume 1 of his work titled Versuch einer wissenschaftlichen Darstellung der Geschichte der neuern Philosophie (6 vols., 1834-1853) (Attempt at a Scientific Presentation of the History of Modern Philosophy). In 1836 he was professor-extraordinary at Halle, became a full professor in 1839, and remained there until his death. He died on 12 June 1892, aged 86, in Halle. One day before his 87th birthday 

He published many philosophical textbooks and treatises, and a number of sermons; but his chief claim to remembrance rests on his elaborate Grundriss der Geschichte der Philosophie (Outline of the History of Philosophy, 2 vols, 1866), the 4th edition of which has been translated into English. Erdmann's special merit is that he does not rest content with being a mere summarizer of opinions, but tries to exhibit the history of human thought as a continuous and ever-developing effort to solve the great speculative problems with which man has been confronted in all ages. His chief other works were: Leib und Seele (Body and Soul, 1837), Grundriss der Psychologie (Outline of Psychology, 1840), Grundriss der Logik und Metaphysik (Outline of Logic and Metaphysics, 1841), and Psychologische Briefe (Psychological Letters, 1851).

Erdmann had many readers, students, and followers, and influenced many intellectuals of his time. Some of these include Niels Thulstrup, his student Albrecht Ritschl, his colleague Martin Kähler, and members the Hegelian school, such as Kuno Fischer, Bruno Bauer, Ludwig Feuerbach and Karl Ludwig Michelet. Søren Kierkegaard studied and was inspired in his early studies by Erdmann's works, in particular his Vorlesungen über Glauben und Wissen als Einleitung in die Dogmatic und Religionphilosophie (Lectures on Faith and Knowledge as an Introduction to Dogma the Philosophy of Religion). Although Kierkegaard integrated much of Erdmann's work into his own, the only work in which Erdmann was cited by him was his dissertation On the Concept of Irony with Continual Reference to Socrates.

Commentary on Erdmann
John Dewey wrote in the Andover Review:
The combination of qualities necessary to produce a work of the scope and grade of Erdmann's is rare. ...Erdmann wrote his book [A History of Philosophy: Ancient and Mediaeval Philosophy], not as a reference book... but as a genuine history of philosophy, tracing in a genetic way the development of thought in its treatment of philosophic problems. Its purpose is to develop philosophic intelligence rather than to furnish information. ...Erdmann unites a minute and exhaustive knowledge of philosophic sources at first hand, equalled over the entire field of philosophy probably by no other one man... To the student who wishes... a somewhat detailed knowledge of the evolution of thought, and of what this and the other writers have contributed to it, Erdmann is indispensable; there is no substitute.

Selected works
 A History of Philosophy Vol. 1 Ancient and Mediæval Philosophy (1893)
 A History of Philosophy Vol. 2 Modern Philosophy (1897)
 A History of Philosophy Vol. 3 German Philosophy Since Hegel (1890)
 Outlines of Logic and Metaphysics (1896)

References

External links
 Almost complete collection of Erdmann's works as PDFs (most from GoogleBooks)

1805 births
1892 deaths
People from Valmiera
People from Kreis Wolmar
Baltic-German people
Emigrants from the Russian Empire to Germany
German Protestants
Protestant philosophers
19th-century philosophers
Philosophers of religion
19th-century German philosophers
German historians of philosophy
19th-century German people
German male non-fiction writers
19th-century German writers
19th-century German male writers
University of Tartu alumni
Humboldt University of Berlin alumni
Academic staff of the Martin Luther University of Halle-Wittenberg